The men's underwater swimming was an event on the Swimming at the 1900 Summer Olympics schedule in Paris. It was held on 12 August in the Seine. There were 14 competitors from 4 nations. The event was won by Charles Devendeville of France, with his countryman André Six taking second. Denmark's Peder Lykkeberg took third despite being clearly the best underwater swimmer; he swam in circles though the distance portion of the score was measured in a straight line.

Background

The 1900 Games were the only occasion such an event was held. It was not featured at later Olympic games because of lack of spectator appeal.

Competition format

The score was given by adding one point for each second and two points for each metre swum underwater. The distance was measured in a straight line from the starting point.

Schedule

Results

References

External links 
 1900 Summer Olympics swimming events results

Swimming at the 1900 Summer Olympics
Freediving
Underwater sports